Mohamad Ikhwan bin Yazek (born 25 August 2000) is a Malaysian professional footballer who plays for Malaysia Super League club Kelantan as a winger.

Early life

Ikhwan was born in Lati Pasir Pas hospital and played for Pahang Malaysia Sports School and the Negeri Sembilan FC under 21 team.

Career

Before the 2022 season, Ikhwan signed for Kelantan. During a 2-1 win over PDRM, he scored a goal some observers regarded as worthy of Puskas award nomination. Before the 2023 season, he established himself as one of Kelantan's most promising young players.

Style of play

Ikhwan mainly operates as a winger.

Personal life

Ikhwan has four siblings.

Career statistics

Club

References

External links 

2000 births
Living people
People from Kelantan
Association football midfielders
Malaysian footballers
Malaysia Premier League players
Malaysia Super League players
Kelantan United F.C. players
Kelantan F.C. players